Below is a list of governors of the North-West Frontier Province (NWFP) from the creation of the office of Commissioner of the North-West Frontier Province in 1901.

Chief Commissioners of the North-West Frontier Province
1901–1908: Sir Harold Arthur Deane
1908–1909: Sir George Olof Roos-Keppel
1909–1910: William Rudolph Henry Merck (acting)
1910–1913: Sir George Olof Roos-Keppel
1913–1915: Sir John Stuart Donald (acting)
1915–1919: Sir George Olof Roos-Keppel
1919–1921: Sir Hamilton Grant
1921–1923: Sir John Loader Maffey
1923–1925: Horatio Norman Bolton
1925–1926: William John Keen (acting)
1926–1930: Horatio Norman Bolton
1930–1931: Sir Stuart Edmond Pearks
1931–1932: Sir Ralph Edwin Hotchkin Griffith (created governor in 1932)

Governors of the North-West Frontier Province
1932–1937: Sir Ralph Edwin Hotchkin Griffith
1937–1939: Sir George Cunningham
1939: Sir Arthur Edward Broadbent Parsons
1939–1946: Sir George Cunningham
1946–1947: Sir Olaf Kirkpatrick Caroe
1947: Sir Rob Lockhart (acting)
1947–1948: Sir George Cunningham

Post-independence

Following Pakistan's independence in 1947, the North-West Frontier became a province of Pakistan. In 2010, the NWFP was renamed to Khyber Pakhtunkhwa.

North-West Frontier Province